Ketsch is a municipality in the district of Rhein-Neckar-Kreis, in Baden-Württemberg, Germany, located on Bertha Benz Memorial Route. It is situated on the right bank of the Rhine, 14 km south of Heidelberg.

References

External links

 Rhine island of Ketsch

Rhein-Neckar-Kreis